François Meyronnis (born 22 December 1961) is a French writer.

Meyronnis was born in Paris. In 1997, along with Yannick Haenel and Frédéric Badré, he founded  (Line of riskiness), a literary magazine. He published his first novel Ma tête en liberté (My mind in freedom) in 2000. During the following years Meyronnis published a number of essays, including L'Axe du Néant (The Axis of Nothingness) which could be considered as the most notable of these and De l'extermination considérée comme un des beaux-arts (On extermination considered as one of the Fine Arts) in 2007. In 2005 was released Poker a series of conversations between Ligne de risque and the French romancier Philippe Sollers. The same year, the book Collectif Ligne de risque was published, containing a large number of past interviews. Amongst which, conversations with the French sinologist François Jullien or heideggerian and conférencier Gérard Guest. In 2009 Yannick Haenel and François Meyronnis published Prélude à la délivrance (Prelude to deliverance) gathering numerous conversations and essays about Varlam Shalamov, Paul Celan and the topic of resurrection in the novel Moby Dick.

References 

Writers from Paris
1961 births
21st-century French non-fiction writers
Living people
French male writers